Kelly Sunderland (born 17 July 1970) is a New Zealand former cricketer. He played four first-class matches for Auckland in 1990/91.

See also
 List of Auckland representative cricketers

References

External links
 

1970 births
Living people
New Zealand cricketers
Auckland cricketers
Cricketers from Auckland